The 2018 People's Choice Awards, officially the 2018 E! People's Choice Awards, were held on November 11, 2018, to honor the best in pop culture for 2018.

This ceremony, the 44th edition of the People's Choice Awards, marked a change of network from CBS to E!, after E!'s acquisition of the awards from Procter & Gamble, and the ceremony's move from January to November.

Performers
 Nicki Minaj & Tyga – "Hard White (Intro/Reprise)", "Good Form" & "Dip"
 Rita Ora – "Let You Love Me"
 John Legend – "Pride (In the Name of Love)"

Winners and nominees
The first round of nominees was announced on September 5, 2018, with the finalists named on September 24. Winners are listed first and in boldface.

Film

TV

Music

Pop culture

Other
 People's Fashion Icon Award
Victoria Beckham

People's Icon of 2018
 Melissa McCarthy

People's Champion Award
 Bryan Stevenson

References

November 2018 events in the United States
2018 awards in the United States
People's Choice Awards
2018 film awards
2018 music awards
2018 television awards
2018 in California